Soyuz T-14 (Union T-14) was the ninth expedition to Salyut 7.  The mission relieved Soyuz T-13, whose crew had performed unprecedented repairs aboard the previously-dead station.

Crew

Backup crew

Mission parameters
 Mass: 
 Perigee: 
 Apogee: 
 Inclination: 51.6°
 Period: 88.7 minutes

Mission highlights
Soyuz T-14 demonstrated the wisdom of maintaining a Soyuz at Salyut 7 as an emergency medical evacuation vehicle: the mission commander Vasyutin fell ill which forced an early termination of the planned 6-month mission.

The main goals of the mission was to receive Cosmos 1686, a modified TKS, and conduct spacewalks with application to future space stations. The first goal was achieved on October 2. Cosmos 1686 contained  of freight, including large items like a girder to be assembled outside Salyut 7, and the Kristallizator materials processing apparatus. However, the crew of Soyuz T-14 were unable to achieve their second goal. By late October Vasyutin was no longer helping with experiments because he was ill.

On November 13 the cosmonauts began scrambling their communications with the TsUP. Return to Earth occurred soon after.  Sources at NASA have reported that psychologists with the Russian Aviation and Space Agency cited Soyuz T-14 as ending prematurely due to "mood and performance issues" with the crew. Vasyutin's illness is said to have been caused by a prostate infection or urinary tract infection, which had manifested itself as inflammation and a fever.

References

External links
 

Crewed Soyuz missions
1985 in spaceflight
1985 in the Soviet Union
Spacecraft launched in 1985